Cavinti, officially the Municipality of Cavinti,  is a 3rd class municipality in the province of Laguna, Philippines. According to the 2020 census, it has a population of 23,980 people.

It is in the Sierra Madre mountain range.

Major produce are its pandan made products, including the Sambalilo (straw hat).

It is also known for its cathedral cave, Cavinti Falls, and Bumbungan Eco Park.

The official song of the Municipality of Cavinti and its people is Cavinti Hymn or Imno ng Cavinti. The anthem was composed by Bonifacio J. Linay, a native of Cavinti.

History 
The municipality of Cavinti was originally a part of Lumban, Laguna. It was only in 1619 when the town gained complete and independent status as a parish by virtue of a papal bull believed to have come directly from Rome. In fact, this was why, again according to the legends, the two Puhawan brothers of Lumban, in search of food in early 1600, reached Cavinti where they found an image which turned out to be that of El Salvador. They brought the image to their home in Lumban. But in no time, it got lost only to be found again the very same place where it was first discovered. Today on that hallowed grounds stands majestically the centuries-old Catholic Church in honor of El Salvador built by the town's forebears for all the generations to enjoy and cherish.

The church's early structures were made of light materials. For many times they had to rebuild it on account of destruction wrought by natural calamities such as earthquakes, typhoons, and fires.

The ecclesiastical supervision of the church also belonged to Lumban since its founding. Even at the time of the construction of the first stone church in 1621.

The Spanish Period 
During this era, Cavinti is one of the least villages of Lumban, Laguna. The population is very low and no significant development was recorded since during that time development was focused on Municipality of Lumban. The town of Cavinti serves that time as a hunting ground for hunters.

The American Period 
Cavinti became one of the municipalities with high insurgency due to the construction of hydropower dam where several lands were submerged.

Two connected man-made lakes (Lake Lumot and Lake Caliraya) were built by American engineers in 1943 to supply water to the Caliraya Hydroelectric Plant. As the dams were constructed, entrepreneurs with foresight created two adjacent communities which were envisioned to be ecological communities, where one can enjoy the beauty and richness of unspoiled nature. The results were man-made mountain lakes complete with coves and sandbars - Lake Caliraya and Lake Lumot. The Americans also seeded the lake with Largemouth Black Bass imported from the US, which continues to proliferate and provide game fishers with year-round weekend excitement.

In fact, the two lakes are some of the places in the whole country where Philippine anglers can attempt to catch the famed Largemouth Black Bass, one of the top freshwater gamefish of the United States of America. During this regime, no further economic and infrastructure projects were implemented in the town of Cavinti.

The Japanese Occupation 
All over the country, Japanese period was the days of disorder, fear, and desolation.  Shortage of food, limited infrastructure, limited medical services and limited educational services were rampant in the whole country. The Philippines was run by a ‘puppet’ government as it was being governed by the watchful eyes of the Japanese Imperial Army.

During this regime, insurgency becomes rampant and no further economic and infrastructure was implemented in the town of Cavinti.

The Third Republic 
During this period, people in Municipality of Cavinti gave their hope in the new form of government. However, due to the effect of war, there was an extensive problem in infrastructure specifically roads, bridges and the construction of schools along with the problems of pestilence and starvation. Thus, there was no further development for the town of Cavinti right until the 1960s, when ground was broken on the Lake Caliraya shoreline for the building of the resort communities which began a period of economic rebirth, despite occasional threats of insurgency by the New People's Army. Today, the highland town of Northeastern Laguna continues to grow economically and as a tourism center for visitors coming from all over the country and overseas.

Geography
Cavinti is situated on the eastern side of the province of Laguna. The town is bounded by the municipality of Lumban in the north, by the municipalities of Sampaloc, Quezon and Mauban, Quezon in the east, Pagsanjan in the west, and by Luisiana in the south. It has 19 barangays.

Climate
Like most areas in the province of Laguna, the Climate of Cavinti is characterized by two pronounced seasons: dry from March to May and wet during the rest of the year.

Barangays
Cavinti is politically subdivided into 2 urban and 17 rural barangays.

 Anglas
 Bangco
 Bukal
 Bulajo
 Cansuso
 Duhat (urban)
 Inao-Awan
 Kanluran Talaongan
 Labayo
 Layasin
 Layug
 Lumot/Mahipon
 Paowin
 Poblacion (urban)
 Sisilmin
 Silangan Talaongan
 Sumucab
 Tibatib
 Udia

Poblacion
It is the center of commercial and business activities in Cavinti. Almost all of the basic municipal facilities are located in Poblacion including the Municipal Hall, Town Plaza, ABC Multi-Purpose Hall, the Public Market, and many commercial and business establishments. The Catholic Church (Transfiguration Parish) and Aglipayan Church are also located in Poblacion.

Demographics

People from Cavinti are being called by nearby towns as "kabintiin".

Language
The language spoken in the town is the national language of the country: Filipino language (Tagalog). The media of instruction in schools are English and Tagalog languages.

Economy 

Cavinti is primarily an agricultural town. At the población, there are only a few commercial establishments which cater to the basic services of the people.

Sources of income of the people of Cavinti are mainly focused on tourism and agriculture such as palay, bamboo, pandan, copra, coconut, vegetables and fruit trees. Piggery and poultry farming are also sources of additional income for the townfolks. The business income of the local government primarily comes from CBK Power Plants, Resorts, Hotels and Restaurants and operation of several tourism-related projects. 

Annual budget:
 Internal revenue allotment : Php 47,346,700.00
 Economic enterprise        : Php 24,452,640.00
 National wealth share      : Php 8,000,000.00
 Local revenue              : Php 17,762,500.00
 Total : Php 97,561,840.00
 Income class : 3rd Class

Annual events and festivals
Independence Day Celebration (June 12) - Floral offering at the monument of Dr. Jose P. Rizal (the country's national hero) and a short program for the people to develop their sense of pride and nationalism.

Sambalilo Festival (August 3–6) - The Sambalilo Festival is one of the most colorful and prosperous festivals in the province of Laguna. It is celebrated to celebrate the handmade sombrero(hat) made from pandan that has been the foremost livelihood of the people since time immemorial. Highlights of the fiesta include trade fair exhibits, Cavinti's Got Talent, Brass band bonanza, street dancing, fireworks display, Cavinti Fun run, Palarong Pinoy (Traditional or cultural games), Exhibition game of PBA players vs. Cavinti All Stars and the world's biggest Sambalilo.

Christmas Day (December 25) - Christmas Day in Cavinti is an integration of festive and competitive Christmas activities showcasing colorful highlight and array of decorations in barangay and Municipal Building.

Tilapia Festival (February 26–28) - The first Tilapia Festival was launched on February 26–28, 2014 to promote tilapia trading in Cavinti. This celebration is the people's way of thanksgiving to the Almighty God by the tilapia traders in the town of Cavinti—a town that has been gradually identified for its fresh, delicious, and tasteful tilapia compared to other towns. Highlights of this festival featured Motorcade,Tilapia Olympics, Street grilling of tilapia and other kinds of seafood, Photo Contest, Seminar for Tilapia traders and Food Fest.

Harvest Festival (October 2–3) -  This festival showcases the abundance of various fruits that have become synonymous with Cavinti like santol, lanzones, rambutan, papaya, and durian. All the barangays participate as the festivities highlight the abundance of the fruits in season.

Mayflower Festival (Celebrated during the month of May) - It is an old annual tradition by the Catholic majority which includes offering of flowers to the image of the Virgin Mary by those young girls all dressed in white called "associadas" while praying the rosary, and the holding of various Santacruzans around the town. The Hermanos and Hermanas, chosen for each year, lead the festivities as a way of sharing their blessings to them.

Tourist destinations

Natural features like waterfalls, rivers, lakes, caves and mountains are located in Cavinti. The Pagsanjan Falls, which is locally known as Cavinti Falls, is actually located in Cavinti. Access to the falls is through Cavinti's own Pueblo El Salvador Cavinti Nature's Park and Picnic Groove in barangay Tibatib-Anglas. Visitors can view the nearby Mount Banahaw along the man-made lakes of Caliraya and Lumot. Sailing, wind surfing and kayaking are other activities common along the lake areas. There also other sites in Cavinti, like the Bumbungan Twin Falls, The Cavinti Underground River and Caves Complex, the Bayakan Falls and Bat Cave.

List of tourist destinations:
 Cavinti Falls (a.k.a. Pagsanjan Falls) (Barangay Anglas/Tibatib)
 Cavinti Underground River and Caves Complex (Barangay Paowin)
 Nakulo Falls (Barangay Anglas/Tibatib)
 Caliraya Lake is a man-made lake popular for surface water sports and recreational fishing. (Barangay East and West Talaongan) and shared with the town of Lumban
 Lumot lake is another man-made lake connected to Caliraya Lake by an underground penstock, which is also popular for water sports and sport fishing. (Barangay Mahipon, Inao-awan, Bukal, Cansuso, and Paowin)
 Bumbungan Eco Park (Barangay Tibatib)
 Pueblo El Salvador Cavinti Nature's Park and Picnic Grove (Barangay Anglas/Tibatib)
 Japanese Garden (Barangay West Talaongan)
 Bayakan Falls (Barangay Tibatib)
 Bat Cave (Barangay Tibatib)
 Bumbungan Twin Falls (Barangay Sumucab)
 Talon ng Caliraya (Barangay West and East Talaongan)
 Roman Catholic Church (Transfiguration Parish) (1606)
 Aglipay Church
 Farmshare Agri Park (Barangay Duhat)

Government

Like other towns in the Philippines, Cavinti is governed by a mayor and vice mayor who are elected to three-year terms. The mayor is the executive head and leads the town's departments in executing the Sangguniang Bayan's ordinances and improving public services. The vice mayor heads a legislative council consisting of councilors, as members.

Elected officials
At present, Cavinti Municipal officials are:
 Mayor : ARRANTLEE R. ARROYO
 Vice Mayor : MILBERT L. OLIVEROS
 Municipal councilors : 
 CHARLES CLIFFORD F. MATTA
 JIMMY JOSE V. OLIVEROS
 ROMEL J. VILLANUEVA
 STEPHANIE PRINCESS P. DE GUZMAN
 GODFREY L. LUBUGUIN
 ELMA PRINCIPE FLORES
 GLENN HAZE M. CABUHAT
 HABSHAN DEVE D. BLASTIQUE

Infrastracture

 Municipal health clinics
 Public market
 Cavinti Covered Court
 Cavinti Sports Complex
 ABC Multi-Purpose Hall

Transportation
From Metro Manila Passing Through Rizal Province Via Manila East Road. From Manila via Calamba, a bus will take you to Santa Cruz, Laguna. In Santa Cruz, jeepneys going to Cavinti can be found at the jeepney's terminal. Via Santa Cruz, you will pass by the town of Pagsanjan before you reach Cavinti. You will easily know it when you have reached the town because the roads become zigzagged with many sharp twists and turns. Transportation to its barangays are served by tricycles and jeepneys.

Another routes/mode of transportation to go to Cavinti:
 Cavinti to Santa Cruz (jeepney - via Pagsanjan) - Main (Cavinti)
 Cavinti to Santa Cruz (jeepney - via Lumban) - Main (Cavinti)
 Lucban to Santa Cruz (mini-bus) - Via Cavinti
 Lucena to Santa Cruz (mini-bus) - Via Cavinti
 Luisiana to Santa Cruz (jeepney) - Via Cavinti
 Infanta to Lucena (bus) - via Cavinti

Roads and bridges:
 There are two main roads in Cavinti, the Cailles St. where the Public Market and many commercial and business establishments located and the Magsaysay Drive where many commercial, stores, and business establishments located too.
 The two main bridges in Cavinti is the Cavinti Bridge which connects the barangay Duhat and barangay Poblacion, and another main bridge in Cavinti is the Tibatib Bridge which connects the barangay Tibatib and barangay Poblacion.

Communication system
 Landline : PLDT
 Internet connection : SmartBroadband, Globe, PLDT
 Cellular phones : Smart, Globe, Sun Cellular, DITO 4G
 Postal service : Philpost Inc.
 Cable/PayTV : Royal Cable / Community Cable Cignal (PLDT)

Utilities
 Electricity : (FLECO) First Laguna Electric Cooperative
 Water - Cavinti Water Supply System

Education
Public and private schools in Cavinti:

High schools:
 Public : 4
 Private: 1

Elementary :
 Public : 17
 Private: 1

Day Care schools : 17

College : DEAF School (BarangayPaowin)

Media
 ABS-CBN: Channel 2
 GMA Network: Channel 7
 TV5: Channel 5
 People's Television Network: Channel 4
 GMA News TV: Channel 11

References

External links

[ Philippine Standard Geographic Code]
Official Website of Cavinti
A website about Cavinti
Cavinti information from Local Governance Performance Management System

Municipalities of Laguna (province)